Cole Miller (born April 26, 1984) is a retired American mixed martial artist, who most recently competed in the featherweight division in the UFC. His nickname "Magrinho" means "skinny" in Portuguese.

Mixed martial arts career 

Before giving it up to train for MMA full-time, Miller was a standout baseball player at Mount de Sales Academy (in Macon, Georgia), where he was raised. He was also a member of Macon-based Team Praxis, under instructor Cam McHargue, before moving on to American Top Team. Cole's younger brother, Micah, was a professional mixed martial artist with the WEC promotion.

Before turning pro, Cole was the Virginia-based, King Of The Ring 135 lb Champion. As a professional, Miller was the WKA Mixed Martial Arts Lightweight Champion as well as the Indiana Based, Legends of Fighting, Lightweight Champion. He trains at the American Top Team academy in Coconut Creek, Florida under Master Ricardo Liborio, whom he received Blue through Brown Belts in BJJ. Miller is a Brazilian Jiu-jitsu Black Belt under Marcos "Parrumpinha" Da Matta who frequently corners him in his UFC fights. Miller made his featherweight debut in Shooto, being defeated by Shooto World Champion Takeshi Inoue by unanimous decision, while taking the fight on short notice.

The Ultimate Fighter 

Miller was a contestant on The Ultimate Fighter 5 show, featuring lightweights. He was a member of Jens Pulver's Team. Cole won his preliminary fight on the show against Allen Berube by Triangle Choke in the first round. Cole then fought against Joe Lauzon in the quarter-finals of the competition. After a competitive first round, the two fighters engaged quickly in the second, with Cole Miller looking for submissions off his back. Lauzon then landed an illegal elbow to the back of Miller's head. 

After taking the recovery time, Miller signaled that he was okay and the fight resumed. Lauzon immediately took Miller down and starting landing clean shots.
Miller covered up and refused to improve his position, prompting the referee to stop the fight. After the fight, both Dana White and Lauzon were unhappy with the outcome of the fight, stating that the illegal blow was what caused Miller to stop attacking and cover up.

Ultimate Fighting Championship 

Miller made his official UFC debut at The Ultimate Fighter 5 Finale, defeating Andy Wang via TKO at 1:10 of the 1st round.

He then went on to defeat Leonard Garcia at UFC: Fight Night 11. His winning streak came to a halt when he lost to Jeremy Stephens at UFC: Fight Night 12 by TKO in the 2nd round.

On July 5, 2008, at UFC 86, Cole submitted Brazilian jiu jitsu black belt and 6-time Brazilian State champion, Jorge Gurgel, with a triangle choke in the 3rd round. Cole was a purple belt in Brazilian Jiu-Jitsu at the time. He later said that it was the biggest win of his career. He was awarded Submission of the Night.

Cole Miller went on to defeat Junie Browning on April 1, 2009 at UFC Fight Night: Condit vs. Kampmann, finishing the fight early in the first round. After Browning was caught by a right hook from Miller, he shot in for a takedown. Miller stuffed it, and locked in a guillotine choke on Browning. Immediately after Miller got the win, he leaned down and yelled in Browning's face, "Who's overrated now?!"

Miller next fought Ultimate Fighter 8 winner Efrain Escudero at UFC 103, losing via first-round KO.

Miller submitted Dan Lauzon on January 2, 2010, at UFC 108 using a kimura with an inverted triangle hold in round one. He was once again awarded Submission of the Night honors.

Miller was expected to face Andre Winner on March 31, 2010, at UFC Fight Night 21, but an injury to Miller forced him from the card. He was replaced by Rafaello Oliveira.

Miller submitted The Ultimate Fighter 9 winner, Ross Pearson, via second round rear-naked choke on September 15, 2010, at UFC Fight Night 22. Coming into his fight with Pearson, many suggested that Miller would look for a takedown due to Pearson's superior striking. However, Miller outstruck Pearson in the second round, rocked him with a left hook, and hopped onto his back to sink in the fight ending rear naked choke. Miller won his second straight Submission of the Night honors.

Miller was expected to face Matt Wiman on January 1, 2011, at UFC 125, but the bout eventually took place on January 22, 2011, at UFC Fight Night 23. Miller was dominated by Wiman, resulting in a unanimous decision defeat.

Miller faced TJ O'Brien on August 14, 2011 at UFC on Versus 5. He won the fight via submission due to a one arm guillotine choke in the second round.

For his next fight Miller dropped to featherweight and faced Steven Siler on March 3, 2012 at UFC on FX 2. He lost the fight via unanimous decision.

Miller fought Nam Phan at UFC on Fox 4 on August 4, 2012. He lost the bout via split decision after three rounds.

Miller faced Bart Palaszewski on April 13, 2013 at The Ultimate Fighter 17 Finale. He won the fight via submission in the first round.

Miller faced Manny Gamburyan on August 17, 2013 at UFC Fight Night 26. He lost the fight via unanimous decision.

Miller faced Andy Ogle on October 26, 2013 at UFC Fight Night 30. He won the fight via unanimous decision.

Miller faced Sam Sicilia on January 15, 2014 at UFC Fight Night 35. He won the fight via rear naked choke in the second round.  The win also earned Miller his fourth Submission of the Night bonus award.

On April 9, 2014 Miller announced his new four-fight contract with UFC via Twitter.

Miller was expected to face Conor McGregor on July 19, 2014 at UFC Fight Night 46.  However, Miller pulled out of the bout citing a thumb injury and was replaced by Diego Brandão.

Miller faced Max Holloway on February 14, 2015 at UFC Fight Night 60. He lost the fight by unanimous decision.

Miller faced Jim Alers on December 19, 2015 at UFC on Fox 17. The bout was ruled a No Contest after Miller was accidentally poked in the eye by Alers in the second round and was unable to continue.

Miller was expected to face returning veteran B.J. Penn on June 4, 2016 at UFC 199, replacing an injured Dennis Siver. However, Penn was removed from the card on May 23 after he was flagged for a potential anti-doping violation. Miller instead faced Alex Caceres. He lost the fight via unanimous decision.

Miller was expected to face Mizuto Hirota on October 15, 2016 at UFC Fight Night 97. However, the promotion announced on October 6 that they had cancelled the event entirely. In turn, the fight was rescheduled and eventually took place on December 17, 2016 at UFC on Fox 22 Miller lost the bout by unanimous decision. Miller has since been removed from the roster page on the UFC's website.

Championships and accomplishments
Ultimate Fighting Championship
Submission of the Night (Four times)
Knockout of the Night (One time)

Mixed martial arts record

|-
|Loss
|align=center|21–11 (1)
|Mizuto Hirota
|Decision (unanimous)
|UFC on Fox: VanZant vs. Waterson
|
|align=center|3
|align=center|5:00
|Sacramento, California, United States
|
|-
|Loss
|align=center|21–10 (1)
|Alex Caceres
|Decision (unanimous)
|UFC 199
|
|align=center|3
|align=center|5:00
|Inglewood, California, United States
|
|-
|NC
|align=center|21–9 (1)
|Jim Alers
|NC (accidental eye poke)
|UFC on Fox: dos Anjos vs. Cowboy 2
|
|align=center|2
|align=center|1:44
|Orlando, Florida, United States
|
|-
|Loss
|align=center|21–9
|Max Holloway
|Decision (unanimous)
|UFC Fight Night: Henderson vs. Thatch
|
|align=center|3
|align=center|5:00
|Broomfield, Colorado, United States
|
|-
|Win
|align=center|21–8
|Sam Sicilia
|Submission (rear-naked choke)
|UFC Fight Night: Rockhold vs. Philippou
|
|align=center|2
|align=center|1:54
|Duluth, Georgia, United States
|
|-
| Win
|align=center| 20–8
| Andy Ogle
| Decision (unanimous)
| UFC Fight Night: Machida vs. Muñoz
| 
|align=center| 3
|align=center| 5:00
|Manchester, England
|
|-
| Loss
|align=center| 19–8
| Manny Gamburyan
| Decision (unanimous)
| UFC Fight Night: Shogun vs. Sonnen
| 
|align=center| 3
|align=center| 5:00
|Boston, Massachusetts, United States
|
|-
| Win
|align=center| 19–7
| Bart Palaszewski
| Submission (rear-naked choke)
| The Ultimate Fighter: Team Jones vs. Team Sonnen Finale
| 
|align=center| 1
|align=center| 4:23
|Las Vegas, Nevada, United States
|
|-
| Loss
|align=center| 18–7
| Nam Phan
| Decision (split)
| UFC on Fox: Shogun vs. Vera
| 
|align=center| 3
|align=center| 5:00
|Los Angeles, California, United States
|
|-
| Loss
|align=center| 18–6
| Steven Siler
| Decision (unanimous)
| UFC on FX: Alves vs. Kampmann
| 
|align=center| 3
|align=center| 5:00
|Sydney, Australia
| 
|-
| Win
|align=center| 18–5
| TJ O'Brien
| Submission (guillotine choke)
| UFC Live: Hardy vs. Lytle
| 
|align=center| 2
|align=center| 2:38
|Milwaukee, Wisconsin, United States
|
|-
| Loss
|align=center| 17–5
| Matt Wiman
| Decision (unanimous)
| UFC: Fight for the Troops 2
| 
|align=center| 3
|align=center| 5:00
|Fort Hood, Texas, United States
|
|-
| Win
|align=center| 17–4
| Ross Pearson
| Submission (rear-naked choke)
| UFC Fight Night: Marquardt vs. Palhares
| 
|align=center| 2
|align=center| 1:49
|Austin, Texas, United States
| 
|-
| Win
|align=center| 16–4
| Dan Lauzon
| Submission (modified kimura)
| UFC 108
| 
|align=center| 1
|align=center| 3:05
| Las Vegas, Nevada, United States
| 
|-
| Loss
|align=center| 15–4
| Efrain Escudero
| KO (punches)
| UFC 103
| 
|align=center| 1
|align=center| 3:36
| Dallas, Texas, United States
|
|-
| Win
|align=center| 15–3
| Junie Browning
| Submission (guillotine choke)
| UFC Fight Night: Condit vs. Kampmann
| 
|align=center| 1
|align=center| 1:58
| Nashville, Tennessee, United States
|
|-
| Win
|align=center| 14–3
| Jorge Gurgel
| Submission (triangle choke)
| UFC 86
| 
|align=center| 3
|align=center| 4:48
| Las Vegas, Nevada, United States
| 
|-
| Loss
|align=center| 13–3
| Jeremy Stephens
| TKO (punches and elbows)
| UFC Fight Night: Swick vs. Burkman
| 
|align=center| 2
|align=center| 4:44
| Las Vegas, Nevada, United States
|
|-
| Win
|align=center| 13–2
| Leonard Garcia
| Decision (unanimous)
| UFC Fight Night: Thomas vs. Florian
| 
|align=center| 3
|align=center| 5:00
| Las Vegas, Nevada, United States
|
|-
| Win
|align=center| 12–2
| Andy Wang
| TKO (head kick and punches)
| The Ultimate Fighter 5 Finale
| 
|align=center| 1
|align=center| 1:10
| Las Vegas, Nevada, United States
| 
|-
| Win
|align=center| 11–2
| Josh Souder
| Decision (split)
| LOF 10: Unbreakable
| 
|align=center| 3
|align=center| 5:00
| Indianapolis, Indiana, United States
|
|-
| Win
|align=center| 10–2
| John Strawn
| Submission (armbar)
| Absolute Fighting Championships 19
| 
|align=center| 1
|align=center| 2:21
| Boca Raton, Florida, United States
| 
|-
| Loss
|align=center| 9–2
| Takeshi Inoue
| Decision (unanimous)
| Shooto 2006: 7/21 in Korakuen Hall
| 
|align=center| 3
|align=center| 5:00
| Tokyo, Japan
|
|-
| Win
|align=center| 9–1
| Saul Mitchell
| Submission (triangle choke)
| Diesel Fighting Championships 1
| 
|align=center| 1
|align=center| 3:19
| Dallas, Texas, United States
|
|-
| Win
|align=center| 8–1
| Joe Germain
| Submission (guillotine choke)
| Full Throttle 7
| 
|align=center| 1
|align=center| 0:36
| Duluth, Georgia, United States
|
|-
| Win
|align=center| 7–1
| Vince Libardi
| Submission (guillotine choke)
| International Freestyle Fighting 1
| 
|align=center| 1
|align=center| 0:16
| Fort Worth, Texas, United States
|
|-
| Win
|align=center| 6–1
| Dwayne Shelton
| Submission (rear-naked choke)
| CSC: River City Rumble
| 
|align=center| 3
|align=center| 3:48
| Mechanicsville, Virginia, United States
|
|-
| Win
|align=center| 5–1
| Jarrett Becks
| Submission (guillotine choke)
| Full Throttle 6
| 
|align=center| 1
|align=center| 1:01
| Atlanta, Georgia, United States
|
|-
| Win
|align=center| 4–1
| David Love
| TKO (punches) 
| North American Combat Challenge 2
| 
|align=center| 1
|align=center| 1:26
| Key West, Florida, United States
|
|-
| Loss
|align=center| 3–1
| Josh Odom
| Decision (majority)
| Full Throttle 5
| 
|align=center| 3
|align=center| 5:00
| Duluth, Georgia, United States
|
|-
| Win
|align=center| 3–0
| Tim Honeycutt
| KO (knee)
| Full Throttle 4
| 
|align=center| 1
|align=center| 0:23
| Duluth, Georgia, United States
|
|-
| Win
|align=center| 2–0
| Chris Mickle
| Submission (triangle choke)
| Full Throttle 3
| 
|align=center| 1
|align=center| 1:39
| Duluth, Georgia, United States
|
|-
| Win
|align=center| 1–0
| Harris Norwood
| Submission (triangle choke)
| Full Throttle 2
| 
|align=center| 1
|align=center| 3:14
| Atlanta, Georgia, United States
|

Mixed martial arts exhibition record

|-
|Loss
|align=center|1-1
|Joe Lauzon
|TKO (punches)
|The Ultimate Fighter 5
| (air date)
|align=center|2
|align=center|3:58
|Las Vegas, Nevada, United States
|
|-
|Win
|align=center|1-0
|Allen Berube
|Submission (triangle choke)
|The Ultimate Fighter 5
| (air date)
|align=center|1
|align=center|2:33
|Las Vegas, Nevada, United States
|

See also
 List of current UFC fighters
 List of male mixed martial artists

References 
http://fightstarmma.com/diego-brandao-replaces-cole-miller-vs-connor-mcgregor/

External links 
 Official Website
Official UFC Profile

Official American Top Team Website
http://fightstarmma.com/diego-brandao-replaces-cole-miller-vs-connor-mcgregor/

American male mixed martial artists
Mixed martial artists from Georgia (U.S. state)
People from Richmond County, Georgia
Lightweight mixed martial artists
Mixed martial artists utilizing Brazilian jiu-jitsu
American practitioners of Brazilian jiu-jitsu
People awarded a black belt in Brazilian jiu-jitsu
Living people
1984 births
People from Coconut Creek, Florida
Ultimate Fighting Championship male fighters
Sportspeople from Macon, Georgia